Alvaro Cartei (28 September 1911 in Signa – 8 October 1995 in Signa) was an Italian painter and ceramist.

References

Marco Moretti, Bruno Catarzi Scultore 1903–1996, Masso delle Fate Edizioni, Signa, 2005, 
Giampiero Fossi, Oltre il novecento – Arte contemporanea nelle Signe, Masso delle Fate Edizioni, Signa, 2003, 
Ornella Casazza e Marco Moretti, Giuseppe Santelli – Dipinti e Disegni, Masso delle Fate Edizioni, 1996
Arnolfo Santelli, Un artista gentiluomo – Vita e Viatico di Giuseppe Santelli, Soc. Leonardo da Vinci di Firenze, 1974

20th-century Italian painters
Italian male painters
Italian ceramists
People from Signa
1911 births
1995 deaths
20th-century ceramists
20th-century Italian male artists